La Estación de cría y fauna autóctona Cerro Pan de Azúcar is a nature park and zoo located close to the coastal city of Piriápolis in the Department of Maldonado, in southeastern Uruguay. The park belongs to the Municipal Administration Department of Maldonado. Some 250 examples of 53 species of Uruguayan animals are housed within an area of 86 hectares, surrounded by native trees and bushes. 300,000 people visit the park annually, many of which are groups of students.

Location 
Located in the municipality of Piriápolis, it sits on the hillside of Pan de Azúcar hill, with a peak 1277.9 ft (389.5 meters) above sea level, making it the third tallest hill in the country.

From Piriápolis, the park is accessed, starting from the la rambla de los Argentinos (street or avenue of the Argentines), along la avenida Artigas (Artigas Avenue), which continues onto Route 37. The City of Pan de Azúcar (Sugar bread) is also located there.

History 
The Nature Reserve was created in 1980, at the request of the mayor of Maldonado, Curutchet, and Uruguayan Naturalist Tabare Gonzalez Sierra. It was placed in a hillside of Pan de Azúcar, taking advantage of the fact that a century ago the founder of Piriápolis, Francisco Piria, had created an enormous rock quarry to supply the construction of his new city.

References

Zoos in Uruguay
Nature parks
Piriápolis